In Irish mythology Fodbgen or Odbgen (modern spelling: Foidhbhgen - "the despoiler") son of Sengann of the Fir Bolg became High King of Ireland when he overthrew his cousin Rinnal son of Genann. It is said that before his time there were no knots (Old Irish odb) in trees.

He ruled for four years until he was overthrown by Eochaid mac Eirc, Rinnal's grandson.

Primary sources
 Lebor Gabála Érenn
 Annals of the Four Masters
 Seathrún Céitinn's Foras Feasa ar Érinn

Legendary High Kings of Ireland
Fir Bolg